A Sun scoop or sunscoop is a refueling technique for starships seen in science fiction. It involves a literal scooping of plasma directly from the outer surface of a star to use as fuel. Doing so would be extremely dangerous and only used in emergency situations.

In fiction
 Ray Bradbury's 1953 short story "The Golden Apples of the Sun".
 In the final novel of Peter F. Hamilton's Night's Dawn trilogy, an alien race, inhabiting massive "cities" orbiting a red giant, uses ships equipped with electromagnetic ramscoops as an alternative to planetary mining.
 "42", a 2007 episode of Doctor Who
 Elite (1984) - space trading video game.
 Elite Dangerous (2015) -  multiplayer space flight simulation game.
 "Light", a first-season episode of Stargate Universe and others, including Blockade.
 Rendezvous with Rama, an Arthur C. Clarke novella.

References

Energy sources